Cannabis in Ohio is legal for medical use and illegal for recreational use. Since 1975, possession of up to  has been decriminalized, with several of the state's major cities having enacted further reforms. Medical use was legalized in 2016 through a bill passed by the state legislature.

Decriminalization (1975)
On August 22, 1975, Governor James Rhodes signed a bill decriminalizing cannabis, making Ohio the sixth state to do so.

Under Ohio law, the possession of up to 100 grams of marijuana is a "minor misdemeanor" which carries a maximum fine of $150. Possession of more than 100 grams but less than 200 grams of marijuana is a misdemeanor punishable by up to thirty days in jail and a $250 fine.

The FBI's Uniform Crime Reports report that in 2013, 17,000 arrests for marijuana possession were made in Ohio. A 2013 report by the ACLU found that in Ohio, African Americans were 4.1 times more likely than Caucasians to be arrested for marijuana possession.

Issue 3: Failed legalization proposal (2015)
In 2015, a ballot measure to legalize recreational use of cannabis in Ohio was defeated at the polls. The initiative was sponsored by a group of investors that included boy band singer Nick Lachey, NBA Hall of Famer Oscar Robertson, NFL defensive end Frostee Rucker, and fashion designer Nanette Lepore.

Support for Issue 3 was weaker than overall support for legalization, as the measure was criticized for its plan to create a monopoly of cannabis producers. The initiative failed to receive the endorsement of the Drug Policy Alliance and Marijuana Policy Project, and received only a "tepid endorsement" from NORML. Issue 3 was defeated by a 65–35 margin on election day.

Legalization of medical cannabis (2016)
In June 2016, Governor John Kasich signed House Bill 523 to legalize the medical use of cannabis in Ohio. The bill, sponsored by state Representative Stephen Huffman, was approved by an 18-15 vote in the state Senate and by a 67-29 vote in the state House.

The bill set up a rulemaking process under which a "state-run or licensed system of growing facilities, testing labs, physician certification, patient registration, processors, and retail dispensaries" was established. The system was required to be fully operational by September 2018, with the Ohio Department of Commerce to make rules for cultivators by May 6, 2017, to issue rules and regulations for cultivators, and the remainder of rules to be promulgated by October 2017. In the interim, patients with one of 21 qualifying conditions were permitted to go to Michigan or another state with legalized medical cannabis, legally acquire cannabis there, and bring it back to Ohio for use in accordance with Ohio law.

The twenty-one qualifying conditions were: AIDS/HIV, Alzheimer's disease, amyotrophic lateral sclerosis (ALS), cancer, chronic traumatic encephalopathy (CTE), Crohn's disease, epilepsy (or other seizure disorder), fibromyalgia, glaucoma, hepatitis C, inflammatory bowel disease, multiple sclerosis, "pain that is either chronic and severe or intractable," Parkinson's disease, post-traumatic stress disorder, sickle cell anemia, spinal cord disease or injury, Tourette's syndrome, traumatic brain injury, ulcerative colitis, and "any other disease or condition added by the state medical board."

Cultivation of cannabis and ingestion by way of smoking are prohibited under the law, which permits use only in edible, oil, vapor, patch, tincture, or plant matter form. The first licensed sales of medical cannabis occurred on January 16, 2019.

Dispensaries 
The law requires Ohio to re-evaluate the number of dispensaries needed in each dispensary district every two years based on the distribution and number of patients. In June 2018, the state awarded its first licenses. As of September 2021, Ohio had 58 medical dispensaries, only 9 of which were owned by persons of color. The Ohio Board of Pharmacy announced in 2021 another 73 planned licenses would be awarded via lottery, in part to allow equity of access.

Cultivators 
As of 2021 Ohio had licensed 20 cultivators to grow up to 25,000 square feet of marijuana and 15 to grow up to 3,000 square feet.

Patient population 
As of July 2021 there were 125,000 registered medical marijuana patients in Ohio; the state's original plans were keyed to an expected patient population of 24,000.

"Smoke a joint, lose your license" repealed (2016)
Senate Bill 204 was signed into law by Governor Kasich on June 13, 2016.  It repealed a requirement in state law that possession of cannabis or any other illegal drug be punished with a mandatory six month driver's license suspension (instead, the bill made the suspensions optional).  The policy was originally enacted in the early 1990s in response to the passage of the Solomon–Lautenberg amendment at the federal level.  Senate Bill 204 was sponsored by Republican State Senator Bill Seitz, passing with only two opposing votes in the House and unanimously in the Senate.

Petition for legalized recreational cannabis (2022)

In January 2022, organizers of a petition to legalize recreational cannabis submitted over 130,000 valid signatures to force the state legislature to consider the issue.  After the legislature failed to pass the proposal, the petitioners were required to collect an additional 130,000+ valid signature in order to place the proposal on the November ballot.  However, in May 2022, the campaign announced that it had reached a settlement with the state to abandon the effort for 2022 (due to a technicality that could prevent it from appearing on the ballot) while also allowing all of the signatures that had already been submitted to go towards putting the proposal on the 2023 ballot.

Municipal reforms
In September 2015, Toledo residents voted 70%–30% to depenalize misdemeanor cannabis offenses, with no fines and no jail time for: possession or cultivation of under 200 grams, possession of hashish under 10 grams, possession of paraphernalia, and gifts of under 20 grams.  Some provisions of the ordinance were later struck down in court, however.

In November 2018, Dayton residents voted 73%–27% to approve an advisory referendum urging city leaders to decriminalize cannabis.  City commissioners then voted unanimously in January to eliminate all penalties for possession of up to 100 grams.

In June 2019, Cincinnati City Council voted 5–3 to eliminate all penalties for possession of up to 100 grams of cannabis except in cases of public use.

In July 2019, Columbus City Council voted unanimously to reduce the penalty to a $10 fine for possession of up to 100 grams and a $25 fine for between 100 and 200 grams.  Possession of paraphernalia was also reduced to a $10 fine.

In January 2020, Cleveland City Council voted 15–2 to eliminate penalties for possession of up to 200 grams of cannabis.

Other jurisdictions in Ohio that have approved decriminalization ordinances include Bellaire (2016), Logan (2016), Newark (2016), Roseville (2016), Athens (2017), Fremont (2018), Norwood (2018), Oregon (2018), Windham (2018), Bremen (2019), Nelsonville (2019), Northwood (2019), Plymouth (2020), Adena (2020), Glouster (2020), Jacksonville (2020), Trimble (2020), Martins Ferry (2021), Murray City (2021), New Lexington (2021), New Straitsville (2021), Rayland (2021), Tiltonsville (2021), Yorkville (2021), Fostoria (2022), Forest Park (2022), Corning (2022), Hemlock (2022), Kent (2022), Laurelville (2022), Rushville (2022), and Shawnee (2022).

See also
 Ohio NORML

References

External links
 Summary of Ohio's medical marijuana program prepared for members of the Ohio General Assembly